Maurice Rawlings may refer to:

 Maurice S. Rawlings (1922–2010), American cardiologist and author
 Maurice E. Rawlings, Justice of the Iowa Supreme Court